Agricultural Holdings Act is a stock short title used in the United Kingdom for legislation relating to agricultural tenancies.

List
 Agricultural Holdings (England) Act 1875 (38 & 39 Vict c 92)
 Agricultural Holdings (England) Act 1883 (46 & 47 Vict c 61)
 Small Landholders and Agricultural Holdings (Scotland) Act 1931 (21 & 22 Geo 5 c 44)
 Agricultural Holdings Act 1948 (11 & 12 Geo 6 c 63)
 Agricultural Holdings (Scotland) Act 1949 (12 & 13 Geo 6 c 75)
 Agricultural Holdings (Notices to Quit) Act 1977 (1977 c 12)
 Agricultural Holdings (Amendment) (Scotland) Act 1983 (1983 c 46)
 Agricultural Holdings Act 1984 (1984 c 41)
 Agricultural Holdings Act 1986 (1986 c 5)
 Agricultural Holdings (Amendment) Act 1990 (1990 c 15)
 Agricultural Holdings (Scotland) Act 1991 (1991 c 55)
 Agricultural Holdings (Scotland) Act 2003 (2003 asp 11)
 Agricultural Holdings (Amendment) (Scotland) Act 2012 (2012 asp 6)

See also
List of short titles

References

Lists of legislation by short title and collective title